Carrigtwohill GAA is a Gaelic Football and hurling club based in the parish of Carrigtwohill in Cork, Ireland. The club participates in Cork GAA competitions and in Imokilly board competitions. In 2011 the Senior hurling team won a first county title in 93 years .

Roll of honour
 Cork Senior Hurling Championship Winners (2) 1918, 2011, Runners Up 1932, 1933, 1935
 Cork Premier Intermediate Hurling Championship Winners (1) 2007 Runners Up: 2006
 Cork Intermediate Hurling Championship Winners (3) 1909, 1949, 1950 Runners Up: 1942, 1971, 2002
 Cork Junior Hurling Championship Winners (6) 1896, 1915, 1941, 1948, 1966, 1994  Runners Up: 1897, 1962, 1978
 Cork Junior Football Championship Runners Up 1993
 Cork Minor Hurling Championship Winners (1) 1998 Runners Up 1962, 1976, 1977,
 Cork Minor A Hurling Championship Winners (1) 2007
 Cork Minor A Football Championship Runners-Up 1997
 Cork Under-21 Hurling Championship Runners-Up 1993, 2001
 East Cork Junior A Hurling Championship Winners (9) 1941, 1947, 1948, 1956, 1962, 1965, 1966, 1978, 1994  Runners-Up: 1928, 1929, 1943, 1964, 1969
 East Cork Junior A Football Championship: Winners (3) 1993, 1997, 2000  Runners-Up: 1931, 1989, 1992, 2007, 2014

Famous players
 Willie Cummins
 Willie John Daly
 Matty Fouhy
 Ned Grey
 Niall McCarthy
 Séanie O'Farrell
 Jason Barret
 Jimmy "Major" Kennedy

References

External links
Official Site

Gaelic games clubs in County Cork
Hurling clubs in County Cork
Gaelic football clubs in County Cork